Josef Warkany (1902–1992) was a Jewish Austrian American pediatrician known as the "father of teratology".

Early life
Warkany was born in Vienna and this is where he completed his medical studies. By 1932, he had published over 23 articles, before moving to Cincinnati, Ohio, on January 5, 1932, where he remained for the rest of his life.

Career

Two genetic syndromes are named for him: Warkany syndrome 1 and Warkany syndrome 2 is named after him.

Awards
Warkany received many awards in his lifetime for his work, including:

 Academy of Pediatrics Mead Johnson Award (1943)
 Academy of Pediatrics Borden Award (1950)
 Modern Medicine Award for Distinguished Achievement (1964)
 Academy of Pediatrics Howland Award (1970)
 Charles H. Hood Foundation Award (1972)
 American Association on Mental Deficiency Research Award (1976)
 Procter Medal Award for Distinguished Research (1979)
 March of Dimes Basil O'Connor Award (1986)

References

External links
 Photo at ucsd.edu

1902 births
1992 deaths
20th-century Austrian physicians
Austrian pediatricians
Austrian emigrants to the United States